There were 16 female and 41 male athletes representing the country at the 2000 Summer Paralympics.

Medal table

See also
Czech Republic at the 2000 Summer Olympics
Czech Republic at the Paralympics

References

Bibliography

External links
International Paralympic Committee

Nations at the 2000 Summer Paralympics
Paralympics
2000